Nemacheilus shuangjiangensis is a species of ray-finned fish in the genus Nemacheilus although some authorities have placed it in either Schistura or Physoschistura.

References
 

Cyprinid fish of Asia
Freshwater fish of China
Fish described in 1985